Höfler is a surname. Notable people with the surname include:

 Konstantin von Höfler, German historian
 Otto Höfler (1901–1987), Austrian scholar of German studies

See also
 Hoefler (disambiguation)